Toyota Motor Corporation uses many different transmissions in their products.  They can be divided into different families.

Automatic

A-series

The A-series are 2 to 8-speed automatic transmissions for front wheel drive, all wheel drive, or rear wheel drive use built by Aisin-Warner.

Models:
 Axx RWD 2-, 3-, and 4-speed
 A1xx FWD 3- and 4-speed
 A2xx FWD 4-speed

 A3xx RWD/4WD truck
 A4xx RWD/4WD truck
 A5xx FWD
 A6xx RWD/4WD 5-speed
 A7xx RWD/AWD/4WD truck
 A8xx 
 A9xx RWD
 AAxx RWD
 AB6xx RWD/4WD truck
 AC6xx RWD/4WD
 AExx 4WD

U-series

The U-series is an automatic transmission for front wheel drive applications.

Models:
 U1xx
 U2xx
 U3xx
 U66x

CVT

K-series

The K-series are CVT transmissions for front wheel drive.

Models:
 K110 FWD 
 K111 FWD 
 K112 FWD 
 K210 FWD 
 K310 FWD 
 K311 FWD 
 K410 FWD 
 K41A FWD 
 K41B FWD 
 K411 FWD

Manual

C-series

The C-series is a manual transmission for transverse engine applications, front engine front wheel drive and mid-engine rear wheel drive applications, built by Aisin AI, as well in the Elise and Exige.

Models
 C40 4 Speed
 C140 4 Speed
 C50 5 Speed
 C51 5 Speed
 C52 5 Speed
 C53 5 Speed
 C54 5 Speed
 C56 5 Speed
 C57 5 Speed
 C58 5 Speed
 C59 5 Speed
 C150 5 Speed
 C151 5 Speed
 C153 5 Speed (LSD)
 C154 5 Speed (LSD)
 C155 5 Speed (LSD)
 C250 5 Speed
 C251 5 Speed
 C550 5 Speed
 C551 5 Speed
 C60 6 Speed
 C63 6 Speed
 C64 6 Speed
 C65M 6 Speed
 C66/C66M 6 Speed
 C160 6 Speed

E-series

The E-series transmission for front, mid-engine and all wheel drive applications.

Models:
 E50F
 E51
 E52
 E53
 E55F5
 E56
 E57F5
 E58
 E150F
 E151F
 E152F
 E153
 E154F

EB-series

The EB-series is a compact 6-speed transmission for front wheel drive applications.

Models:
 EB60
 EB62

EC-series

The EC-series is a higher-strength compact 6-speed transmission for front and mid-engine applications.

Models:
 EC6x
EC62
EC65
EC69

G-series

The G-series is a 4- and 5-speed manual transmission for rear wheel drive and all wheel drive applications, built by Aisin AI and Toyota Autoparts Philippines.

Models:
 G40 4-speed
 G52 5-speed
 G53 5-speed
 G54 5-speed
 G55 5-speed
 G57 5-speed 4WD
 G58 5-speed 4WD
 G59 5-speed 2WD

H-series

The H-series is a 4- and 5-speed manual transmission for Land Cruisers and Coaster from 1967–present (?) .

Models:
 H41 4-speed
 H42 4-speed
 H55F 5-speed
 H150F 5-speed
 H151F 5-speed
 H152F 5-speed

J-series

The J-series is a 6-speed manual transmission for rear-wheel drive applications, built by Aisin Seiki (Type AZ6). This transmission was used in the Altezza AS200 and RS200. The same Aisin AZ6 transmission is also found in other models such as the Mazda Miata/MX-5/Roadster, Nissan Silvia, Mazda RX-8, Lexus IS and Toyota 86/Scion FR-S/Subaru BRZ.

Models:
 J160 6-speed

There was also a J30 3 speed manual transmission used in 1969-1975 Land Cruisers.

K-series

The K-series is a 4- and 5-speed manual transmission for small cars.

Models:
 K40 4-speed
 K50 5-speed

L-series

The L-series are 4- and 5-speed manual transmissions for rear wheel drive cars and trucks. Not to be confused with the L-series (HSD) hybrid transmissions.

Models:
 L40 4-speed
 L42 4-speed
 L43 4-speed
 L45 4-speed
 L48 4-speed
 L50 5-speed
 L52 5-speed

P-series

The P-series is a 5-speed manual transmission for rear wheel drive cars with Porsche-type synchronizers. Not to be confused with the P-series (HSD) hybrid transmissions.

Models:
 P51

R-series

The R-series is a 5-speed manual transmission for RWD and 4WD vehicles built by Aisin AI, Toyota Autoparts Philippines and Toyota Kirloskar Auto Parts.

Models:
 R150 2WD truck
 R150F 4WD truck
 R151F 4WD truck
 R154 RWD car
 R155 2WD truck
 R155F 4WD truck
 R156F 4WD truck

RA-series

The RA-series is a 6-speed manual transmission for longitudinally-mounted engines in RWD and 4WD vehicles built by Aisin AI.

Models:
 RA60 2WD truck
 RA60F 4WD truck
 RA61F 4WD truck
 RA62 RWD car used in Lexus IS250
 RA63 RWD car used in Lexus IS220d

RC-series

The RC-series is a 6-speed manual transmission for longitudinally-mounted engines in 4WD vehicles.

Models:
 RC60 2WD truck
 RC60F 4WD truck
 RC61 2WD truck
 RC61F 4WD truck
 RC62F 4WD truck

S-series

The S-series is a 5-speed manual transmission for front and mid-engine drive applications.

Models:
 S51
 S53
 S54

T-series

The T-series is a 4- or 5-speed manual transmission.

Models:
 T40 4-speed
 T50 5-speed

W-series

The W-series is a 4- or 5-speed manual transmission built by Aisin AI

Models:
 W40 4-speed
 W45 4-speed aluminum
 W50 5-speed steel
 W51 5-speed aluminum
 W52 5-speed steel
 W55 5-speed aluminum
 W56 5-speed truck
 W57 5-speed
 W58 5-speed
 W59 5-speed truck

V-series
The V-series is a 6-speed manual transmission built by Getrag.

Models:
 V160
 V161

Hybrid

P-series (HSD)

The P-series (HSD) are Hybrid Synergy Drive transmissions used in Toyota and Lexus hybrids for FWD-based platforms.

Models:
 P110 1st generation Prius
 P112 2nd generation Prius
 P310 Harrier Hybrid, Kluger Hybrid, and Lexus RX
 P311 Camry Hybrid, Lexus HS250h (with motorized oil pump & additional cooling)
 P312 Based on P311 - Nissan Altima Hybrid
 P313 Lexus RX450h - based on P310
 P314 Camry Hybrid, Lexus NX300h, Rav4 Hybrid (based on P311)
 P410 Prius Alpha, Prius V, Prius 3rd generation and Lexus CT200H
 P510 Corolla Hybrid, Yaris Hybrid, Prius C (based on the P110)
 P610 4th generation Prius (2017-)
 P710 Camry Hybrid (2018-), RAV4 Hybrid (2019-), Avalon Hybrid (2019-), Lexus ES300h (2019-) Harrier / Venza Hybrid (2021-)
 P711 Lexus UX250h (2018-)
 P810 Highlander Hybrid (2020-), Sienna Hybrid (2021-) RAV4 Prime (2021-)
 P910 Yaris Hybrid (2020-)

L-series (HSD)

The L-series (HSD) are Hybrid Synergy Drive transmissions used in Toyota and Lexus hybrids for RWD-based platforms.

Models:
 L110 GS450h - combines HSD with a 2-speed Ravigneaux gearset 
 L110F LS600h - L110 with AWD
 L210 IS300h, GS300h, & RC300h
 L310 LC500h, LS500h - combines HSD with a 4-speed planetary gearset. Has pre-programmed 10-Speed shifts.
 L310F LS500h AWD - same as L310 but AWD variant.

See also
 List of Toyota engines

References

External links
 
 
 

Toyota
Toyota transmissions